Mehdi Merghem (born 19 July 1997) is a French professional footballer who plays as a midfielder for Ligue 2 club Guingamp.

Career
Merghem made his professional debut for Châteauroux in a 3–2 Ligue 2 win over Brest on 27 July 2017.

Personal life
Born in France, Merghem is of Algerian descent.

References

External links
 
 
 

1997 births
Living people
Sportspeople from Aubervilliers
Association football midfielders
French footballers
French sportspeople of Algerian descent
LB Châteauroux players
En Avant Guingamp players
AS Nancy Lorraine players
Ligue 1 players
Ligue 2 players
Championnat National players
Championnat National 2 players
Championnat National 3 players
Footballers from Seine-Saint-Denis